Tânia Anacleto Gregório (also known as Tanya Anacleto, 1 May 19769 February 2003) was a Mozambican former swimmer, who specialized in sprint freestyle events. She represented Mozambique at the 2000 Summer Olympics, and also held numerous national records in a sprint freestyle double (both 50 and 100 m).

Anacleto competed only in the women's 50 m freestyle at the 2000 Summer Olympics in Sydney. She received a ticket from FINA, under a Universality program, in an entry time of 29.48. She challenged seven other swimmers in heat three, including Nigeria's top favorite Ngozi Monu and Aruba's 15-year-old teen Roshendra Vrolijk. Diving in with a fastest reaction of 0.64 seconds, Anacleto scorched the field effortlessly to hit the wall with a second-fastest time and a Mozambican record of 28.78. Anacleto failed to advance into the semifinals, as she was placed 58th overall out of 74 swimmers in the prelims.

On 9 February 2003 Anacleto and her husband Reginaldo Correia were killed instantly in a road accident after their car crashed into the tree across the Mozambican countryside.

References

External links

1976 births
2003 deaths
Commonwealth Games competitors for Mozambique
Swimmers at the 2002 Commonwealth Games
Olympic swimmers of Mozambique
Swimmers at the 2000 Summer Olympics
Mozambican female freestyle swimmers
People from Beira, Mozambique
Road incident deaths in Mozambique